Anaïs in Love is a 2021 French comedy film directed by Charline Bourgeois-Tacquet. The film was shown in the International Critics' Week section at the 2021 Cannes Film Festival.

Plot
Follows Anaïs, a 30-year-old woman who is broke and has a lover she doesn't think she loves anymore. She meets Daniel, an older married man who immediately falls for her. Meanwhile, Anaïs falls for Emilie, who is Daniel's wife.

Cast
 Anaïs Demoustier as Anaïs
 Valeria Bruni Tedeschi as Emilie
 Denis Podalydès as Daniel
 Jean-Charles Clichet as Yoann
 Christophe Montenez as Raoul

Production
The film was shot on the Brittany peninsula and in the city of Nantes in France.

Critical reception
On review aggregator website Rotten Tomatoes, 90% of 69 reviews are positive, with an average rating of 6.7/10. The site's critics' consensus reads: "The main character may be hard to like, but Anaïs in Love offers a well-acted and breezily humorous take on its admittedly well-worn themes." On Metacritic, the film has a weighted average score of 73 out of 100, based on 18 critics, indicating "generally favorable reviews".

The film was a New York Times Critic's Pick. Manohla Dargis wrote that the movie seems straightforward, looking "clear and bright", and moving "as briskly as its protagonist, with the editing and lively music doing more conspicuous work than the discreet cinematography." In a review for The Wrap, Katie Walsh wrote the style is as breathless and entertaining as the film's protagonist." In a positive review for Indiewire David Ehrlich wrote "If anything, Bourgeois-Tacquet's debut comes off as a deliberate effort to wrench a proud Gallic tradition — manically effervescent movies about motor-mouthed young neurotics — away from the foreign cineastes who've co-opted it for the 21st century, and return it to home soil where it might reconnect with its roots."

References

External links
 
 
 

2021 films
2021 comedy films
French comedy films
2021 LGBT-related films
Female bisexuality in film
French LGBT-related films
LGBT-related comedy films
2020s French films